Aldrans is a municipality in the Innsbruck-Land District, Tyrol (Austria) at an altitude of , which had an area of  and 2,496 inhabitants as January 2015.

Geography
The village is on a highlands terrace southeast of Innsbruck, crossed by numerous river valleys, below the Patscherkofel. Aldrans is on the ancient salt road, which connected Hall in Tirol and Mühlbachl—now the regional road Landesstraße L 38 (Elbögener Straße); the road L 32 (Innsbrucker Straße) connects the village with Innsbruck. Its nearness to the city it makes a residential centre. Part of the municipal boundaries are Prockenhöfe, Wiesenhof, Rans and Herzsee, a lake that is mainly used for fish breeding.

Neighbour municipalities are: Ampass, Ellbögen, Igls, Innsbruck, Lans, Rinn, Sistrans.

History

Origin
The origin of Aldrans as a settlement could date back to the late Bronze Age, after the discovery of a handle of a sword and other objects of Iron Age and La Tène culture. The first mention of the village is reported in a 955 document as Alarein. In 1157 the village is mentioned in documents relating a donation, among the Counts of Andechs  and the Tegernsee Abbey. In 1312, in a document, is mentioned Alrains derived from the old name of Allrainer Veld. In the Middle Ages Aldrans was part of an important market, in cooperation with Ampass, because situated on the salt road benefiting from the transit trade. In the thirteenth century the territory was divided between the Sovereign and the Abbey of Wilten.

The population was passionate of drama so much that, in 1750 and in 1757 play competitions, called Martinsspiele,  were organized and it was active the "Theatre of the Amazons" which were part only women. Aldrans in the nineteenth century was developed as a summer resort and in 1884 was directly connected to Innsbruck with a road.

At the edge of the village a broadcasting station was constructed in 1927. It was shut down on March 1., 1984 and afterward dismantled.

Aldrans figures in Thomas Bernhard's story Amras.

Coat-of-arms
The coat of arms represents the wings of an eagle in the air which form a lily leaf on a gold background. The wings of the eagle remember the insignia of the Counts of Andechs, and the lily leaf that of the Abbey of Tegernsee; the emblem refers to the donation that took place in 1157. The emblem was adopted  November 20, 1979.

Population

Main sights

In 1365 is the citation of a church in Aldrans, in 1426 began the construction of a new church in baroque style, inaugurated in 1482 and dedicated to Saint Martin. The church was transformed in the eighteenth century in Gothic style and in 1893 was destroyed by a fire, which devastated part of the village, than was rebuilt in Gothic style. In 1965 it was enlarged and in 1967 was elevated to parish.

Transport
Aldrans is linked with Innsbruck with the Mittelgebirgsbahn (Highlands railways) Line 6 or with local buses from Innsbruck within 15 minutes.

References

External links

 Town History (German)
 Tourist Information: Aldrans

Cities and towns in Innsbruck-Land District